The 1932 Macdonald Brier, the Canadian men's national curling championship, was held from March 1 to 3, 1932 at the Granite Club in Toronto, Ontario.

Owing to their poor performances (especially Montreal), and a need to have a more "national" event, the separate Montreal and Toronto teams were eliminated prior to the 1932 Brier. The field was thus reduced to 8 teams, seven provinces plus Northern Ontario. This arrangement lasted until 1936 when British Columbia and Prince Edward Island were added to the field.

Both Team Alberta and Team Manitoba finished round robin play tied with 5-2 records necessitating a tiebreaker playoff between those two teams for the Brier championship. Team Manitoba, who was skipped by Jim Congalton defeated Alberta in the playoff 13-8 to capture the Brier Tankard. This was the second time in three years that Manitoba defeated Alberta in a playoff. This was also Manitoba's fifth consecutive Brier championship. As of 2022, this is still a record for most consecutive Brier wins by a province.

This was the second consecutive Brier and the last Brier as of 2022 to have no blank ends.

Teams
The teams are listed as follows:

Round Robin standings

Round Robin results

Draw 1

Draw 2

Draw 3

Draw 4

Draw 5

Draw 6

Draw 7

Tiebreaker

References 

Macdonald Brier, 1932
Macdonald Brier, 1932
The Brier
Curling in Toronto
Macdonald Brier
Macdonald Brier
March 1932 events in North America
1930s in Toronto